A shoulder-fired missile, shoulder-launched missile, man-portable rocket launcher, or man-portable missile is a rocket-propelled explosive projectile small enough to be carried by a single person and fired while held on one's shoulder.  The word "missile" in this context is used in its original broad sense of a heavy projectile, and encompasses all guided missiles and unguided rockets.  In many instances, although not technically defining all shoulder-fired missiles, the name bazooka is regularly used as an informal name, although the actual Bazooka is a type of unguided rocket launcher in its own right.

Types 
There are two kinds of shoulder-launched weapons. The first is the recoilless gun, which is essentially an open-breech cannon.  When fired, the propellant gases are expelled out of the back of the weapon to alleviate the reactional force exerted from the projectile moving forward.

The other type is the rocket-propelled grenade; these typically also use a small recoilless charge or compressed gas system to get the projectile out of the barrel and to a distance where the operator will not be hurt by the rocket's backblast; when the rocket ignites at a safe distance, it further accelerates the projectile or at least keeps it from decelerating in its trajectory.

Shoulder-launched weapons may be guided or unguided.  Missiles can either have a disposable launcher (e.g. Panzerfaust, M72 LAW) or a reusable launcher (e.g. RPG-7).

Roles

Shoulder-launched weapons typically fire at one of two main target types — ground targets or air targets.  Weapons for use against ground targets come in a wide variety of types and sizes, with smaller, unguided weapons generally used for close range combat and larger, guided systems for longer ranges. Most of these weapons are primarily designed for anti-tank warfare, although they are also effective against structures and a number of weapons have been designed specifically for such targets.

Anti-aircraft weapons, known as man-portable air-defense systems (MANPADS), are small surface-to-air missiles.  They are typically infrared homing weapons and used to target helicopters, UAVs and other low-flying fixed-wing aircraft.

History

Rocket-based weapons have a long history, from the black powder fire arrows used by the ancient Chinese to the Congreve rocket referenced in "The Star-Spangled Banner," the national anthem of the United States. They have always been prized for the portability of their launch systems.

The earliest rocket launchers documented in imperial China launched fire arrows with launchers constructed of wood, basketry, and bamboo tubes. The rocket launchers divided the fire arrows with frames meant to keep the arrows separated, and were capable of firing multiple arrow rockets at once. Textual evidence and illustrations of various early rocket launchers are found in the 11th century Southern Song Dynasty text Wujing Zongyao. The Wujing Zongyao describes a portable rocket arrow carrier consisting of a sling and a bamboo tube.

Shoulder-launched rockets have a launch tube. In order to prevent the user from being burned by the exhaust, the rocket (or at least its first stage) must burn out before it leaves the tube, and if present the second stage must fire once the rocket is well clear of the launcher. Even if the operator is safe, there is a sizeable blast effect to the rear.

Also, the rocket must have a reliable ignition system. In modern systems, this is almost always a percussion cap. This system was not fully developed until the German Panzerfaust of World War II, an early one-shot design that also was the first practical recoilless antitank gun and thus used no rocket. The Bazooka was an early rocket-propelled development which could be reloaded.

Usage

From their first conception during the First World War, many portable missiles have been used to give infantry a weapon effective against armored vehicles and fortified structures. The power of the shaped charge meant that the effectiveness of the weapon was not limited by a gun barrel bore nor size of weapon as for example a conventional armor-piercing shell from an artillery piece. As such these man-portable weapons could be used to equip infantry units with their own anti-tank and anti-aircraft weapons.

Shoulder-launched rockets or recoilless guns are a favored anti-technical weapon. They permit otherwise lightly or poorly armed troops (e.g. militias) to destroy modern sophisticated equipment such as close air-support aircraft, helicopters, and lightly armored vehicles.

Attacks come from ambush for the element of surprise and attempt to immobilize a convoy of vehicles, then destroy its defenders, then destroy its contents, then escape before air or artillery support can arrive.

Normally, the militia will plan to have two to four shooters per attacked vehicle. Reliable attack ranges are 50 to 100 m, although attacks can succeed out to 300 m. Self-destruct ranges of common rocket weapons such as RPG-7s are about 900 m.

The usual response to such attacks is to suppress the shooters, with saturation anti-personnel fire, artillery or aerial barrages in area-denial attacks. Submunition and thermobaric weapons are often used to clear landing zones (LZ) for helicopters.

In modern counter-insurgency operations in misty, dusty or night-time situations, advanced optics such as infrared telescopes permit helicopter gunships to observe convoys from beyond human-visible range and still attack insurgents with inexpensive anti-personnel fire. This approach is more economical than area-denial. Protecting as little as 20% of the convoys rapidly depletes an area of active insurgents.

Some examples of shoulder-launched missiles

Anti-tank 
 RPG-2
 RPG-7
 RPG-18
 RPG-22
 RPG-26
 RPG-27
 RPG-28
 RPG-29
 RPG-32
 RPG-76 Komar
 Carl Gustav recoilless rifle
 B-40 Rocket Propelled Grenade
 GIAT Wasp 58 Light Anti-Armour Weapon
 Panzerschreck
 Panzerfaust
 Panzerfaust 3
 PIAT Anti-Tank Grenade Projector
 PF-98 Anti-Tank Rocket Launcher "Queen Bee" 
 Shoulder-launched Multipurpose Assault Weapon (SMAW)
 M72 LAW
 AT4
 LRAC F1
 Instalaza C90-CR (M3)
 C-100
 Bazooka
 NLAW
 M47 Dragon
 FGM-148 Javelin
 FGM-172 SRAW
 M202 FLASH

Anti-aircraft 
 Fliegerfaust
 FIM-92 Stinger
 9K32 Strela-2
 9K34 Strela-3
 9K38 Igla
 Anza
 FIM-43 Redeye Anti-aircraft Missile
 PZR Grom
 Shorts Blowpipe

See also
 Anti-tank guided missile (ATGM)
 Surface-to-air missile (SAM)
 Man-portable air-defense system
 List of missiles

References

Personal weapons
Missile types
Rocket weapons